Perla is an administrative capital of Enmakaje Panchayat, which is in Kasaragod district, Kerala, India.

State Highway 31 passes into the Perla Town, which connects Kalladka and Cherkala. It is easy to reach Mangalore via Vittal.

It is easy to reach towns like Vittal, Puthur, Uppala, Kumbla, Badiyadka, Mulleria

Geography
Perla is Panchayat headquarter of Enmakaje Panchayat. Perla town belongs to Enmakaje Panchayat. It is located in State Highway 31 connecting to Karnataka State Border.

The geographical coordinates of Perla are :12° 578' 0" North, 74° 98' 0" East.

Demographics
As of 2011 census, Perla (Enmakaje village) had a population of 13,230 with, 6,606 males and 6,624 females. The population of children in the age group of 0-6 is 1,348 (10.2% of total population). Perla had average literacy of 88 % lower than state average of 94 %. Male literacy stands at 92.9 % and Female literacy at 83.2 %.

People in Perla speak many languages including Malayalam, Tulu, Kannada.

Climate
Perla has a tropical climate. In most months of the year, there is significant rainfall in Perla. There is only a short dry season and it is not very effective. The Köppen-Geiger climate classification is Am. The average annual temperature in Perla is 25.1 °C. About 3820 mm of precipitation falls annually.

Economy
Arecanut is the chief agricultural product from this place. Other crops, are: Coconut, Rubber, Cashew and Cocoa. Beedi making (various brands) is the occupation of many families here. The Koraga tribal community living in Perla has its own colony. Beedi working is one of the source of Income for them.

Sports
Cricket and football are given major importance in Perla. Other major sports like volleyball, kabaddi, and badminton are also practiced in Perla.

Perla has some major sports clubs like Binny arts&sports club, sunny perla emirates sportings.

Perla school ground is one of the famous grounds in perla also bedrampalla ground is located about 4 km from town. It is horizontal, green and look like a stadium. Cricket and football tournaments are mainly held on SNHS ground.

Bajakudlu stadium is another stadium in Perla. Cricket is mainly practiced there.

Transportation
Perla is well connected to Kasaragod, Badiyadka, Kumbla, Uppala, in Kerala state and Puttur, Vittal, Mangalore in Karnataka state. Local roads have access to National Highway No.66 which connects to Mangalore in the north and Calicut in the south.  The nearest railway station is Kumbla on Shoranur-Mangalore section of Southern railway. The nearest airport is at Mangalore.

Languages
This locality is an essentially multi-lingual region. The people speak Malayalam, Kannada, Tulu, Marathi, Beary, Konkani. Migrant workers also speak Hindi language.

Administration
This village is part of Manjeswaram assembly constituency which is again part of Kasaragod (Lok Sabha constituency)

Educational organizations

 Kasargod Medical College, Ukkinadka,Perla
Nalanda College of Arts and Science,
St Gregorius College of Engineering- Perla
Sri Sathya Narayana High School
GHSS, Padre, Perla
SSHSS, Katukukke, Perla
SSHSS, Sheni, Perla
Sri vagdevi primary school nalka

See also 
 Kattathadka
Uppala
Kasaragod District
Ananthapura Lake Temple
Vittal

References

External links

Manjeshwar area